Martin R Hill (born 1 April 1945) is a former English cricketer. Hill was a right-handed batsman. He was born in Quarry Bank, Brierley Hill, Staffordshire.

Hill made his debut for Staffordshire in the 1966 Minor Counties Championship against Bedfordshire. Hill next played for Staffordshire in 1978, playing 5 further Minor Counties Championship matches. It was in 1978 that he made his List A debut against Devon in the 1st round of Gillette Cup. He made a further List A appearance, against Sussex in the 2nd round of the same tournament. In his 2 List A matches, he scored 20 runs at an average of 10.00, with a high score of 14.

References

External links
Martin Hill at ESPNcricinfo
Martin Hill at CricketArchive

1945 births
Living people
People from Brierley Hill
English cricketers
Staffordshire cricketers